MJ Tyson (born 1986) is an American jewelry designer. 

She graduated in 2004 from the Pingry School. She received both her BFA and MFA from the Rhode Island School of Design (RISD). In 2018 she had a residency at the Studios at MASS MoCA. In 2020 she received the Art Jewelry Forum (AJF) Young Artist award. Her piece, Popular Devotion, was acquired by the Smithsonian American Art Museum as part of the Renwick Gallery's 50th Anniversary Campaign.

References

External links
 Designer of the Day: MJ Tyson interview at Surface

1986 births
Living people
Artists from New Jersey
21st-century women artists
American women artists
Women jewellers
American jewelry designers
People from Morristown, New Jersey
Pingry School alumni